The 2022 NBA G League draft was the 22nd draft of the NBA G League. It was held on October 22, 2022. Sam Merrill was selected by the Cleveland Charge as the first overall pick.

Key

Draft

First round

Second round

Third round

References

NBA G League draft
National Basketball Association lists
NBA G League draft